Canonical domain may refer to:
 CNAME record, loosely called a "canonical domain name"
 One of the simply-connected Riemann surfaces – see uniformization theorem